Atong Demach is a South Sudanese businesswoman and beauty queen. She won the Miss World South Sudan 2011 title and was later crowned as Miss World Africa and Miss World Top 7 in Ordos, China. 
The South Sudanese queen is the first representative of South Sudan to Miss World and the first to win the title of Miss World Africa. She now works as the government of South Sudan's ambassador for culture and a public relations advisor to the government of Japan.

Biography

Early life

Demach was born in the capital of Upper Nile state, Malakal, and moved to Khartoum in her early childhood.

She is the youngest child of the late Ajak Demach and Yar Kuol Tiir. Her father Ajak Demach was a politician in South Sudan. He was a Minister, Speaker of Assembly, chairperson of South Sudan referendum committee Jonglei state (during South Sudan referendum which later led to South Sudan independence in 2011) political advisor and Chairperson of constitutional laws review of Jonglei state until his death in 2013.

Being the daughter of a politician, she grew up understanding the struggle of the people of South Sudan. As many other South Sudanese she went through a tough childhood and experienced the war.

Pageantry

Miss World South Sudan 2011
Demach won the Miss World South Sudan 2011 during the pageant's first edition in South Sudan right after South Sudan became independent on July 9, 2011. She made history as the first South Sudan beauty queen since independence.

Miss World 2012
Demach was crowned as Miss World Africa 2012 in China during the grand final of Miss World 2012 beauty pageant held in the northeastern Chinese mining city of Ordos, Inner Mongolia, located on the edge of the Gobi desert. This made her the first South Sudanese to win the title since Miss World's creation in 1951.
During the preliminaries, she also won the Miss World Top Model title, making her the first African and the first black woman to win this title.

Professional career
After Miss World, Demach was appointed by the government of South Sudan as Ambassador for Culture.

In 2013, she was named as brand ambassador for ZTE, a Chinese multinational telecommunications equipment and systems company. In 2015 she was appointed as International Public Relations Advisor for Japan Government Agency (JICA).

Demach is the owner of Demach production, which produce and organize Beauties of South Sudan.

References

1988 births
Living people
South Sudanese beauty pageant winners
South Sudanese female models
Miss World 2012 delegates